Doré Lake is a lake of Saskatchewan in the basin of the Beaver River. The northern village of Dore Lake is located on South Bay and is accessed by Highway 924. Big Island, Iskwasoo, and Burnt are islands in the north section while Smith Island is to the west. The Doré River flows into the Beaver River from the west side of the lake. Doré is the French Canadian term for walleye.

See also
List of lakes of Saskatchewan

References

External links
Statistics Canada
Saskatchewan Fishing Lakes

Lakes of Saskatchewan